War Feathers is a 1926 American short silent comedy film directed by Robert F. McGowan and nephew Anthony Mack. It was the 54th Our Gang short subject released.

Cast
 Joe Cobb as Joe
 Jackie Condon as Jackie
 Johnny Downs as Johnny
 Allen Hoskins as Farina
 Jannie Hoskins as Mango
 Mildred Kornman as Mildred
 Scooter Lowry as Skooter
 Jay R. Smith as Jay
 Bobby Young as Bonedust
 Peggy Ahern as Peggy

Additional cast
 Chet Brandenburg as Rancher at the Whistling Clam
 Allan Cavan as Train passenger
 George B. French as Rancher at the Whistling Clam
 Ham Kinsey as Conductor
 Sam Lufkin as Sheriff
 Dinah the Mule as herself

See also
 Our Gang filmography

References

External links

1926 films
1926 short films
American silent short films
American black-and-white films
Films directed by Robert F. McGowan
Films directed by Robert A. McGowan
Hal Roach Studios short films
Our Gang films
1926 comedy films
Silent American comedy films
1920s American films
1920s English-language films